Patricia S E Baines (born 1944), is a female former swimmer who competed for England.

Swimming career
She represented England in 110 yards butterfly, at the 1962 British Empire and Commonwealth Games in Perth, Western Australia.

Swimming for the Stoke Newington Swimming Club at the ASA National British Championships she became the 110 yards butterfly in 1962 at Blackpool.

References

1944 births
English female swimmers
Swimmers at the 1962 British Empire and Commonwealth Games
Living people
Commonwealth Games competitors for England